Exe or EXE may refer to:

 .exe, a file extension
 exe., abbreviation for executive

Places
 River Exe, in England
 Exe Estuary, in England
 Exe Island, in Exeter, England

Transportation and vehicles
 Exe (locomotive), a British locomotive
 Rolls-Royce Exe, an aircraft engine
 Extreme E, an electric offroad rally racing series

Other uses
 ".exe" (Person of Interest), an episode of the TV series Person of Interest
 E.X.E., a 19th-century British artillery propellant; see Glossary of British ordnance terms
 .exe, a genre of creepypastas involving haunted video game files

See also

 
 EE (disambiguation)
 E2 (disambiguation)
 2E (disambiguation)
 E (disambiguation)